Lavrovo is the name of several rural localities in Russia:
Lavrovo, Tambov Oblast, a selo in Mordovsky District of Tambov Oblast
Lavrovo, Tomsk Oblast, a village in Tomsky District of Tomsk Oblast
Lavrovo, Kesovogorsky District, Tver Oblast, a village in Kesovogorsky District of Tver Oblast
Lavrovo, Oleninsky District, Tver Oblast, a village in Oleninsky District of Tver Oblast
Lavrovo, Penovsky District, Tver Oblast, a village in Penovsky District of Tver Oblast
Lavrovo, Rameshkovsky District, Tver Oblast, a village in Rameshkovsky District of Tver Oblast
Lavrovo, Sonkovsky District, Tver Oblast, a selo in Sonkovsky District of Tver Oblast
Lavrovo, Torzhoksky District, Tver Oblast, a village in Torzhoksky District of Tver Oblast
Lavrovo, Vyshnevolotsky District, Tver Oblast, a village in Vyshnevolotsky District of Tver Oblast
Lavrovo, Zapadnodvinsky District, Tver Oblast, a village in Zapadnodvinsky District of Tver Oblast

See also
 Lavrov